Hypercompe beckeri is a moth of the family Erebidae first described by Watson and Goodger in 1986. It is found in Argentina.

References

beckeri
Moths described in 1986